Wikstroemia coriacea is a species of plant in the Thymelaeaceae family. It is endemic to French Polynesia.

References

Flora of the Tubuai Islands
coriacea
Least concern plants
Taxonomy articles created by Polbot